The Refugee Review Tribunal was an Australian administrative law tribunal established in 1993. Along with the Migration Review Tribunal, the Refugee Review Tribunal was amalgamated to a division of the Administrative Appeals Tribunal on 1 July 2015.

References

External links
 Refugee Review Tribunal decisions at the Austlii website

1989 establishments in Australia
2015 disestablishments in Australia
Former Commonwealth of Australia courts and tribunals
Government of Australia
Courts and tribunals established in 1989
Courts and tribunals disestablished in 2015